Porcellionides is a genus of woodlice in the family Porcellionidae. It includes the following species :

Porcellionides advena (Stuxberg, 1872)
Porcellionides antalyensis (Verhoeff, 1941)
Porcellionides approximatus (Budde-Lund, 1885)
Porcellionides apulicus Arcangeli, 1932
Porcellionides asifensis (Verhoeff, 1938)
Porcellionides aternanus (Verhoeff, 1931)
Porcellionides attarum (Verhoeff, 1941)
Porcellionides bermudezi Boone, 1934
Porcellionides brunneus (Brandt, 1833)
Porcellionides buddelundi (Verhoeff, 1901)
Porcellionides cavernarum (Vandel, 1958)
Porcellionides cilicius (Verhoeff, 1918)
Porcellionides cingendus (Kinahan, 1857)
Porcellionides coxalis (Budde-Lund, 1885)
Porcellionides cyprius (Strouhal, 1968)
Porcellionides delattini (Verhoeff, 1941)
Porcellionides depressiorum (Verhoeff, 1943)
Porcellionides divergens (Verhoeff, 1949)
Porcellionides elegans (Pollo Zorita, 1982)
Porcellionides fagei Paulian de Félice, 1939
Porcellionides floria Garthwaite & Sassaman, 1985
Porcellionides frontosus (Budde-Lund, 1885)
Porcellionides fuscomarmoratus (Budde-Lund, 1885)
Porcellionides ghigii (Arcangeli, 1932)
Porcellionides habanensis Van Name, 1936
Porcellionides hispidus (Miers, 1877)
Porcellionides kosswigi (Vandel, 1980)
Porcellionides lepineyi Paulian de Félice, 1939
Porcellionides linearis (Budde-Lund, 1885)
Porcellionides mateui (Vandel, 1954)
Porcellionides minutissimus (Boone, 1918)
Porcellionides muelleri Arcangeli, 1926
Porcellionides myrmecophilus (Stein, 1859)
Porcellionides myrmicidarum (Verhoeff, 1918)
Porcellionides nigricans (Brandt, 1833)
Porcellionides olivarum (Verhoeff, 1928)
Porcellionides parcus (Budde-Lund, 1885)
Porcellionides peregrinus (Budde-Lund, 1885)
Porcellionides pica (Dollfus, 1892)
Porcellionides politulus (Budde-Lund, 1885)
Porcellionides pruinosus (Brandt, 1833)
Porcellionides rectifrons (Budde-Lund, 1885)
Porcellionides reticulorum (Verhoeff, 1943)
Porcellionides rogoulti Paulian de Félice, 1939
Porcellionides rufocinctus (Dollfus, 1892)
Porcellionides saussurei (Dollfus, 1896)
Porcellionides sexfasciatus (Budde-Lund, 1885)
Porcellionides subterraneus (Verhoeff, 1923)
Porcellionides tingitanus (Budde-Lund, 1885)
Porcellionides trifasciatus (Dollfus, 1892)
Porcellionides virgatus (Budde-Lund, 1885)
Porcellionides viridis (Budde-Lund, 1885)

References

Porcellionidae
Taxa named by Edward J. Miers
Isopod genera